Bit Pazar Shooting or Bit Pazar Incident took place on 6 November 1992. At the time, it was an event that weakened the stability of Macedonia and raised the possibility of an outbreak of armed conflict between ethnic Albanians and Macedonians in the country.

Background 
Following independence, relations between the Macedonian state and the ethnic Albanian minority were tense due to disagreements over sociopolitical rights. Amidst that situation, on 6 November 1992, action was undertaken by Macedonian police against smuggling operations within Bit Pazar, an open marketplace located in the capital city Skopje.

Shooting 

A series of accounts exist as to what took place thereafter. In one rendition, a teenager in Bit Pazar from an Albanian background that sold smuggled cigarettes tried to run away from police during a routine inspection and in the process, stumbled and yelled to say the police were physically attacking him. It generated a riot at Bit Pazar, shots were fired and 6 individuals killed.

In another recollection, the teenager was taken by police to a hospital and that he was either treated badly or killed resulting in a group of 2000 people in an angered state to assemble and attempt to enter the medical facility. Later, police dressed in riot gear arrived with a support van to stabilise the location. Shots were fired from afternoon till nighttime and that protestors were armed with guns and grenades. Fatalities included a Macedonian female passerby and an Albanian, whereas 30 individuals became wounded.

The other versions of the event state that the police arrested some Albanians during their operations in Bit Pazar with the media reporting that a young Albanian male, from the village of Ljuboten, was psychically attacked at a police station resulting in death. A group of people angered by the incident later assembled, declared the innocence of the men and demonstrated against discrimination from the state. The protest risked breaking out into violence and fueled concerns that armed conflict might occur.

Aftermath
The initial event caused confusion and a protest at Bit Pazar that in the enuring confrontation, police shot and killed 1 Macedonian female and 3 Albanian males. Some people in the protests carried guns and at the time it was said among Macedonian circles that those wounded or killed were from Albania and Kosovo and not citizens from Macedonia. In some parts of Skopje, buses were stoned, and in others, barricades made from tyres were erected. At the funerals for Albanians, there was large turnout that for a short time obstructed major roads. A scholar stated that the Bit Pazar event was over economic considerations due to Albanian mafia operations and that the confrontation was devoid of political reverberation from ethnic Albanians or Albanian political leaders.

The incident at Bit Pazar, nonetheless, placed the majority of people in Tetovo and Skopje in a warlike atmosphere. People kept away from city streets in the evening and both ethnic groups were preparing for the possibility of a larger conflict. Ethnic Albanians and Macedonians credit Mitat Emini, then part of the Party for Democratic Prosperity (PDP) leadership and who had the trust of Macedonian leaders as stopping the situation from escalating out of control. Emini, speaking for more than half an hour in Albanian publicly intervened and urged Albanians in the country to not go out onto the streets.

Macedonian-Albanian relations in the country were thrown into crisis due to the Bit Pazar shooting. The event placed the spotlight on the real possibility of violent conflict in the state, similar to the ongoing war in Bosnia-Hercegovina. For Macedonians, it sparked fears regarding the future and whether Albanians were loyal to Macedonia. The Macedonian Ministry of Internal Affairs, dominated at the time by former communist members with anti Albanian sentiments, used the Bit Pazar incident as a reason not to  recruit Albanians into the security service.

Some reactions among Macedonians involved othering such as describing Albanians as divjaci ("savages"), criminals, a threat to the state, overdemanding when it came to rights, with the Bit Pazar shooting as the work of organised elements, in reference to criminality and Albanian ethnicity. The Bit Pazar shooting had the effect for Macedonians of transposing an image of Albanians as different through their Albanian language and Muslim religion, being prone to criminality and violence. The incident also weakened attempts to portray the republic as a robust and secure country and to get further global recognition through its preferred name of the Republic of Macedonia.

References

1992 in the Republic of Macedonia
Old Bazaar, Skopje
Conflicts in 1992
1992 controversies
1992 in politics